Robert Muller, Mueller or Müller may refer to:

 Robert Muller (United Nations) (1923–2010), Belgian-French United Nations civil servant.
 Robert Muller (screenwriter) (1925–1998), German-born British screenwriter
 Robert Mueller (born 1944), American Director of the FBI and special counsel 
 Bobby Muller (born 1946), American peace activist
 Robert Müller (ice hockey) (1980–2009), German ice hockey goaltender
 Robert Müller (footballer) (born 1986), German footballer
 Robert Enrique Muller (1881–1921), official photographer for the United States Navy

See also
 Robert Mueller Municipal Airport, a former airport in Austin, Texas, US
 Moeller, a surname
 Moller (including also Möller and Møller), a surname
 Mueller (surname)
 Müller (surname)